Hypsopsetta macrocephala is a flatfish of the family Pleuronectidae. It is a demersal fish that lives on bottoms in the tropical waters of the eastern Pacific and the Gulf of California.

References

Hypsopsetta
Fish described in 1936